Shay Segev (born 1976) is a business executive in the technology sector and the CEO of DAZN, the over-the-top (OTT) sports subscription streaming service. Described by Gaming Intelligence as a tech “futurist”, Segev is the former chief executive of Entain plc, previously GVC Holdings, a global sports betting and gambling company listed on the London FTSE 100 index. Before that he was chief operating officer of Playtech, a gambling software development company listed on London's FTSE 250.

Early life and education 
Segev obtained an MBA from Northwestern University - Kellogg School of Management in 2005.

Career 
From 1994 to 1998, Segev worked as a computer engineer in the Israel Defense Forces, before joining software provider Comverse Technology in 1998 to manage the R&D for their mobile messaging applications.

Segev left Comverse in 2004 to become chief technology officer of Mercury Interactive, a software company developing business technology optimization solutions for the IT industry. In 2006, Segev joined Videobet, a subsidiary of gambling software company Playtech, as chief operating officer. Segev became chief operating officer of parent company Playtech in 2011 and CEO of its retail subsidiary. Segev joined the Gaming Standards Association as a board member at the same time.

In July 2015, Segev joined Gala Coral Group as chief strategy officer. In 2016, he joined GVC Holdings as COO to lead the merger between GVC and bwin.party. Segev is credited with finding €125 million in cost synergies, transforming the business and returning it to growth.

In March 2018, GVC Holdings acquired Ladbrokes Coral, Segev's former company, and was responsible for the integration of the two businesses.

In 2018, Segev was instrumental in establishing the joint venture between MGM Resorts and GVC, as it was then. He joined the board of BetMGM (Roar) in this capacity.

In July 2020, Segev succeeded Kenny Alexander as CEO following his departure after thirteen years in the post. As CEO, Segev unveiled a new corporate identity, which saw the company change its name from GVC Holdings to Entain plc and unveil a new strategy centred on growth and sustainability.

In 2021, Entain's joint venture partner MGM Resorts tried to acquire Entain for $11 billion.  The offer was rejected by Segev and the board on the basis that it "significantly undervalue[d] the company and its prospects".

In January 2021, it was announced that Segev will join DAZN, the OTT subscription video streaming service owned by billionaire  Len Blavatnik, as co-CEO. DAZN chairman John Skipper said Segev will bring "vast technology and operations experience to the role as well as an impressive track record in digital transformation". DAZN was described by the Evening Standard as one of the United Kingdom's few tech "unicorns". In January 2022, Segev was appointed the sole CEO of DAZN.

In September 2022, Segev announced that DAZN would acquire ELEVEN Sports and Team Whistle.

Awards 
Segev has appeared in the Gaming Intelligence Hot 50 more times than anyone else.

References

Living people
British chief executives
1976 births